The 2000 Eastern Michigan Eagles football team represented Eastern Michigan University in the 2000 NCAA Division I-A football season. In their first season under head coach Jeff Woodruff, the Eagles compiled a 3–8 record (2–5 against conference opponents), finished in fifth place in the West Division of the Mid-American Conference, and were outscored by their opponents, 350 to 209. The team's statistical leaders included Walter Church with 2,326 passing yards, John White with 561 rushing yards, and Kenny Christian with 808 receiving yards. Walter Church received the team's most valuable player award.

Schedule

Roster

References

Eastern Michigan
Eastern Michigan Eagles football seasons
Eastern Michigan Eagles football